Saša Zorić (born 2 September 1974) is a Serbian former footballer who played as a midfielder.

Club career
Born in Gornji Milanovac, Zorić started out at local club Takovo, before joining the youth system of Red Star Belgrade. He would make his senior debut with First League of FR Yugoslavia newcomers Jastrebac Niš during the 1993–94 season. Between 1994 and 1996, Zorić spent two seasons with Obilić.

In late 1996, Zorić moved to the United States to play indoor soccer by signing with the Baltimore Spirit on a two-year contract. He totaled 75 appearances and scored 67 goals over his two seasons in the National Professional Soccer League (NPSL). In 1997, Zorić briefly played for the Hershey Wildcats of the A-League.

In 1998, Zorić returned to his homeland and rejoined Obilić. He spent two seasons with the club, scoring 14 goals in 49 league games over the next two seasons. In July 2000, Zorić was transferred to his parent club Red Star Belgrade. He helped them win the championship title in the 2000–01 season, before returning to Obilić. From 2003 to 2006, Zorić played three seasons for Smederevo, formerly known as Sartid.

In 2006, Zorić moved abroad for the second time and joined Chinese club Nanjing Yoyo. He also played for Changsha Ginde and Xiamen Lanshi, before returning to Serbia and joining Kolubara in early 2008. After brief stints with Srem and Banat Zrenjanin, Zorić retired from the game.

International career
At international level, Zorić represented FR Yugoslavia at the 2001 Kirin Cup, appearing in both of his team's matches in the tournament.

Honours
Red Star Belgrade
 First League of FR Yugoslavia: 2000–01
Kolubara
 Serbian League Belgrade: 2007–08

References

External links
 
 
 

1974 births
Living people
People from Gornji Milanovac
Serbia and Montenegro footballers
Serbian footballers
Association football midfielders
Serbia and Montenegro international footballers
FK Jastrebac Niš players
FK Obilić players
Baltimore Spirit players
Hershey Wildcats players
Red Star Belgrade footballers
FK Smederevo players
Nanjing Yoyo players
Changsha Ginde players
Xiamen Blue Lions players
FK Kolubara players
FK Srem players
FK Banat Zrenjanin players
First League of Serbia and Montenegro players
National Professional Soccer League (1984–2001) players
A-League (1995–2004) players
China League One players
Chinese Super League players
Serbian First League players
Serbia and Montenegro expatriate footballers
Serbian expatriate footballers
Expatriate soccer players in the United States
Expatriate footballers in China
Serbia and Montenegro expatriate sportspeople in the United States
Serbian expatriate sportspeople in China